Vallecorsa is a comune (municipality) in the Province of Frosinone in the Italian region Lazio, located about  southeast of Rome and about  south of Frosinone, in the Monti Ausoni area.

Economy is based on olive production.

History
The town is known as a fortified borough from around the 9th century AD. The ancient structure is the broken down castle, which was destroyed in a battle. The ancient castle is a boundary between the Papal States and the Kingdom of Naples.

International relations

Vallecorsa is twinned with:
 Monte Sant'Angelo, Italy (since 2009)

References

External links
 Official website

Cities and towns in Lazio